Al Sabeen Maternal Hospital, also  El Sabeen Maternity and Child Hospital, is a hospital in Sana'a, Yemen. It is located in the south of the city, immediately north of the Saleh Mosque.

References

Buildings and structures in Sanaa
Hospitals in Yemen